Fraserville is a rural community in Cumberland County, Nova Scotia. It is located along Route 209 and one of the communities along the Fundy Shore Ecotour. It is adjacent to Spencer's Island to the west and East Fraserville to the east.

References

Communities in Cumberland County, Nova Scotia